The Realm of the Rye' (Swedish: Rågens rike) is a 1950 Swedish drama film directed by Ivar Johansson and starring Eric Laurent, Peter Lindgren and Nine-Christine Jönsson. 

It was shot at the Centrumateljéerna Studios in Stockholm. The film's sets were designed by the art director P.A. Lundgren. It is a remake of the 1929 silent film of the same name.

Cast
 Eric Laurent as Mattias Larsson
 Peter Lindgren as 	Markus
 Nine-Christine Jönsson as 	Klara Torkelsdotter
 Linnéa Hillberg as 	Klara's Mother
 Wilma Malmlöf as 	Hilda
 Sten Lindgren as 	Gusten
 Erik Sundqvist as 	Jan
 Rune Ottoson as 	Lill-Matt
 Alf Östlund as Josua Larsson
 Arthur Fischer as 	Parish constable
 Ivar Hallbäck as Kalle
 Knut Lindroth as 	Reverend
 Lissi Alandh as Hildur
 Martin Ljung as 	Olle
 Torgny Anderberg as 	Kors-Petter

References

Bibliography 
 Qvist, Per Olov & von Bagh, Peter. Guide to the Cinema of Sweden and Finland. Greenwood Publishing Group, 2000.

External links 
 

1950 films
Swedish drama films
1950 drama films
1950s Swedish-language films
Films directed by Ivar Johansson
Swedish black-and-white films
1950s Swedish films